The National Ringette League (NRL),, is the premier sports league for the sport of ringette in North America and Canada's national league for elite ringette players aged 18+. The NRL is not a feminized variant of a more well-known men's league or sport like professional women's ice hockey or bandy. This is due to the fact that one of ringette's distinctive features is that all of its elite players are girls and women. The NRL is semi-professional and operates as a showcase league for ringette in North America.

The NRL is the continent's first and only winter team sports league whose entire elite athlete roster involves players who are women rather than men and is not a subsidiary of a men's league. It was founded in 2002 and began play the following year with November 2004 marking its official inaugural season. Players are selected from the league to help form Canada's national ringette teams. Today, some NRL games are livestreamed on YouTube.

National Ringette League games are divided into four periods with each period lasting 13 minutes. Teams compete in two conferences: the Western Conference and Eastern Conference (which is further divided into Eastern Conference Red, and Eastern Conference White). The NRL functions as a committee under Ringette Canada, a non-profit sports organization and the national governing body of ringette in Canada; it has an established Board of Governors. All NRL players are unpaid and the majority come from Canada, with some originating primarily from Finland, with others from the United States and other countries. In some cases, players have been traded between clubs in Canada's NRL to Ringette Finland's semi-professional ringette league, SM Ringette (formerly called ), and vice versa.

The National Ringette League playoffs at the Canadian Ringette Championships (CRC) began in 2008 when they replaced the national championships for Under-19 years and Open divisions. Playoffs are held annually at CRCs to determine an annual league champion; they consist of knockout matches, round robins, and tournaments. Today the tournament takes place in just one city. The winning National Ringette League team is awarded with the Jeanne Sauvé Memorial Cup - named after Canada’s first female Governor General, Jeanne Mathilde Sauvé (née Benoît) - which serves as the league’s championship trophy. 

In 2009, an episode of Canada's 'Rick Mercer Report' called "Ringette Night In Canada" featured both the NRL itself as well as the Cambridge Turbos - one of its teams. In 2013, Télé Québec broadcast a short documentary film titled 'Tout le monde dehors - La Ringuette' which focused on the Gatineau Fusion - another NRL team but based in Québec - along with Yvon Brault who devotes his life to this sport.

History 

Ringette is a Canadian sport that was first introduced in 1963 in North Bay, Ontario. For ten years, play was confined to Ontario and Quebec, however the sport spread quickly and is now played by over 30,000 players and involves over 50,000 participants across Canada. It was not until the success of the 2002 World Ringette Championships in Edmonton, Alberta, when Canada won the gold medal that the desire to create, establish and organize the National Ringette League emerged. The first NRL season began in November 2004 with seventeen teams in three cross-country divisions. There was not a championship match after the first NRL season. Former Team Canada goaltender, Keely Brown, helped form the NRL in 2002 and 2003.

Competition

Background 

Over thirty different teams have competed in the NRL since it began in 2004, but not all teams have survived. The Cambridge Turbos have the won the most NRL titles. The NRL is now divided into three conferences: Western, Eastern Red, and Eastern White. For the 2021-22 season, there were 12 teams playing in a hub format, down from 15 teams from the previous year, due to Covid-19. The LMRL Thunder in British Columbia (Lower Mainland Thunder), and the Ottawa Ice from Ontario are the only now defunct NRL teams in league history to have won a Canadian Ringette Championship NRL title along with the Jeanne Sauvé Memorial Cup, and the league's national championship gold medal. The LMRL Thunder won in 2011–12, and the Ottawa Ice won the league title in 2013–14. Both the LMRL Thunder and the Ottawa Ice won the NRL championship once in their team's history while their clubs were active.

The inaugural season in November 2004 saw 17 teams competing in three divisions across Canada: the Western division had eight teams, the Ontario division had four teams, and Quebec had five teams.

The league's second season in 2005-06 formally began October 15, 2005, since the league officially launched the previous season. For the 2005–06 season, the league had 19 teams competing in four divisions - the Western Division had five teams, the new Central Division had five teams, an Ontario Division had five teams, and a Québec Division with four teams. 

The Eastern Conference in 2005-06 included the Ontario and Québec divisions. Ontario teams included the Cambridge Turbos, Gloucester Devils, Ottawa Ice, Richmond Hill Lightning and Waterloo Wildfire. The Ottawa Ice was an expansion team. The Québec division included the BLL Nordiques (who later became the Bourassa Royal) the Cyclones de Québec, the Montreal Mission, and Rive–Sud Revolution, all returning from the previous season. Teams in the Central Division included the APFG Sixers, BoniVital Angels, Eastman Flames, Hix with Stix, and Manitoba Moose. The Western Division included the returning league champion, the Edmonton WAM!, the Calgary RATH, BC Reign, the Saskatoon Wild, and the previous year's wild card team, the Edmonton Edge. With nineteen teams competing, it was this NRL season which recorded the highest number of teams competing in the NRL in a single season in league history. The 2005–06 NRL season also marked inaugural season of the NRL Championship.

League structure 
All teams compete in one of either two Conferences: the Western Conference or the Eastern Conference. The Eastern Conference is divided into two divisions: Red and White.

The Western Conference consists of teams from Western Canada and includes teams from the provinces of British Columbia, Alberta, Saskatchewan, and Manitoba.

The Eastern Conference is divided separately into two different divisions, Red and White, and includes teams from Ontario, Quebec, and Atlantic Canada.

NRL general regulation 
Characteristic of North American sports, the NRL is a closed league with no relegation. There is an annual draft in between seasons, which is the main entry for new players in the league. The NRL runs four regional drafts; in 2011, there was one for the region of Ottawa and Gatineau, another one for Manitoba, another for Southern Ontario, and another for the Montreal region. Trading among teams is also common.

NRL National Championship format 

The NRL Championship, which crowns the team champion of the league, is played annually by the eight best teams in the league at the Canadian Ringette Championships in the National Ringette League division.

History
In 2010–11, the introduction of a new NRL Championship Tournament replaced the Championship qualifying rounds. The tournament took place in just one city. The format was intended to allow the league to create a media event and to hold attention. The top ten teams in the regular season of the league participated in the tournament.

Starting in 2011–12, eight teams play a full round robin to determine the champion, also called the Elite Eight.

Teams

Current teams

Western Conference

BC Thunder

The BC Thunder is a ringette team in the National Ringette League (NRL) based in British Columbia. The team competes in the NRL Western Conference and was founded in 2012.

The following is the Thunder roster for the 2022–23 season.

Calgary RATH

The Calgary RATH is a ringette team in the National Ringette League (NRL) based in Calgary, Alberta. The team competes in the NRL Western Conference and was founded in 2007. The RATH consists of players from Western Canada and is one of the NRL's earliest teams to join the league.

The team's home arena is in Calgary, Alberta. In 2013, the RATH won their first National Ringette League Playoff title and the Jeanne Sauvé Memorial Cup. The team has competed in 13 National Championships (Canadian Ringette Championships) and holds three National Ringette League titles having won in 2013, 2019, and 2022.

The following is the RATH roster for the 2022–23 season.

RATH players have competed for the Canada national ringette team at the World Ringette Championships (WRC) and are listed in the table below.

Edmonton WAM!

The Edmonton WAM! is a ringette team in the National Ringette League (NRL) based in Edmonton, Alberta. The team competes in the NRL Western Conference. The WAM! holds three National Ringette League titles having won in 2007, 2010, and 2011.

The following is the WAM! roster for the 2022–23 season.

Edmonton Black Gold Rush

The Edmonton Black Gold Rush, (commonly called "The Rush" or "Rushies"), is a ringette team in the National Ringette League (NRL) based in Edmonton, Alberta. The team competes in the NRL Western Conference and was founded in 2015.

The following is the Rush roster for the 2022–23 season.

Manitoba Herd

The Manitoba Herd is a ringette team in the National Ringette League (NRL) based in Winnipeg, Manitoba. The team competes in the NRL Western Conference and was founded in 2021.

The following is the Herd's roster for the 2022–23 season.

Saskatchewan Heat

The Saskatchewan Heat is a ringette team in the National Ringette League (NRL) based in Saskatoon, Saskatchewan. The team competes in the NRL Western Conference and was founded in 2021.

The following is the Heat's roster for the 2022–23 season.

Eastern Conference Red

Cambridge Turbos

The Cambridge Turbos is a ringette team in the National Ringette League (NRL) based in Cambridge, Ontario. The team competes in the NRL Eastern Conference in the Red Division and was founded in 2003 and holds six National Ringette League titles having won in 2005–06, 2007–08, 2008–09, 2014–15, 2015–16, and 2016–17.

The following is the Turbos roster for the 2022–23 season.

Waterloo Wildfire

The Waterloo Wildfire is a ringette team in the National Ringette League (NRL) based in Waterloo, Ontario. The team competes in the NRL Eastern Conference in the Red Division.

The following is the Wildfire's roster for the 2022–23 season.

Nepean Ravens

The Nepean Ravens is a ringette team in the National Ringette League (NRL) based in Nepean, Ontario (Ottawa). The team competes in the NRL Eastern Conference in the Red Division and was founded in 2021.

The following is the Ravens roster for the 2022–23 season.

Gatineau Fusion

The Gatineau Fusion is a ringette team in the National Ringette League (NRL) based in Gatineau, Quebec. The team competes in the NRL Eastern Conference in the Red Division and was founded in 2008.

The following is the Fusion's roster for the 2022–23 season.

Eastern Conference White

Rive-Sud Révolution

The , ("South Shore Revolution" in English), is a ringette team in the National Ringette League (NRL) based in Montérégie, the southwestern part of Québec. The Revolution competes in the NRL Eastern Conference in the White Division and was founded in 2004. The Revolution is one of the oldest teams in the NRL.
 
The team's home arena is in Québec and its headquarters are located in South Shore, Montreal. The South Shore is located within the Quebec administrative region of Montérégie. Its team affiliate is the U19 South Shore Revolution.

The Revolution began competing for their 16th year as a club during the NRL 2022-23 season. The following is the Révolution's roster for the 2022–23 season.

Rive-Sud Révolution players have competed for the Canada national ringette team at the World Ringette Championships (WRC) and are listed in the table below.

Montreal Mission

The Montreal Mission is a ringette team in the National Ringette League (NRL) based in Montreal, Quebec. The team competes in the NRL Eastern Conference in the White Division and was founded in 2004.

The following is the Mission roster for the 2022–23 season.

Atlantic Attack

The Atlantic Attack is a ringette team in the National Ringette League (NRL) based in New Brunswick. The team competes in the NRL Eastern Conference in the White Division and was founded in 2011 and holds one National Ringette League title having won the 2017–18 season.

The following is the Attack's roster for the 2022–23 season.

National Ringette League champions 
National Ringette League (NRL) champions compete annually at the Canadian Ringette Championships at the end of the NRL season. The 2019–20 and 2020–21 seasons were cancelled due to the COVID-19 pandemic.

Jeanne Sauvé Memorial Cup winners

The table below provides a chronological list of Jeanne Sauvé Memorial Cup winners at the Canadian Ringette Championships (CRC) and the NRL's teams who won the gold, silver, and bronze medals.

Awards and honours

Jeanne Sauvé Memorial Cup 

The final competition for the National Ringette League is held annually at the Canadian Ringette Championships. The Jeanne Sauvé Memorial Cup is the championship trophy awarded annually to the winning team in the National Ringette League. The trophy is named after the late Jeanne Mathilde Sauvé (née Benoît), commonly known as Jeanne Sauvé, a former Governor General of Canada who became the first female Governor General in the nation's history.

Initially coined the "Jeanne Sauvé Cup", and initiated in December 1984, it was first presented at the 1985 Canadian Ringette Championships in Dollard-des-Ormeaux, Québec. It is now called the Jeanne Sauvé Memorial Cup in memory of the late Governor General of Canada.

NRL Annual Award nominees 

At the end of March, during the week break before the National Ringette League Championships, the League names its annuals Award Nominees. Award winners are announced at the closing banquet of the Canadian Ringette Championships.

The awards program recognizes the performance of NRL athletes during regular season play with trophies for:

 Rookie of the Year
 Most Valuable Player
 Top Forward
 Top Centre
 Top Defence
 Top Goalkeeper

There are also awards for:

 Coaching Staff of the Year
 NRL Top Scorer
 NRL Scoring Champion

National Ringette League seasons

2003–04 

The 2003–04 NRL season marked the National Ringette League's inaugural year with 17 teams competing across Canada. The competition was referred to as the "Open Division" and took place in Waterloo, Ontario.

2004–05 

There wasn't an NRL championship for the 2004–05 NRL season but a competition took place at the Canadian Ringette Championships in Calgary, Alberta for the Open division.

2005–06 

The 2005–06 season marked the NRL's second season with 19 teams competing and two new teams joined the league, one of which was the Ottawa Ice. These teams were distributed in four conferences: the West Conference - five teams, Central Conference – five teams, Ontario Conference - five teams, and Quebec Conference - four teams. The dominant teams were the Cambridge Turbos in the Ontario Conference, Montreal Mission in the Quebec Conference, in the Western Division the Edmonton WAM! and the champions of the Central Division, the APFG Sixers (Assiniboine Park/Fort Garry, an AA provincial team from Manitoba).

At the end of the regular season were the qualifying rounds: eight teams participated in the National Ringette League playoffs which crowned the team champion of the league. The 2005–06 NRL season finals took place at the 2006 Canadian Ringette Championships in Longueuil, Quebec. The championship match of the NRL/LNR took place in the Centre Étienne Desmarteau in Montreal, on April 1, 2006, and was won by the Cambridge Turbos.

During the off-season three teams folded citing low attendance revenue.

2006–07 

In 2006–07, the NRL entered its third season and consisted of 16 teams distributed in three conferences: the West Conference – seven teams, Ontario Conference – five teams, all in Ontario, and Quebec Conference – four teams. The 2006–07 NRL Championship finals were played as the "Open Division" at the 2007 Canadian Ringette Championships in Halifax, Nova Scotia. The Championship finale match took place in on April 10, 2007, and was won by the Edmonton WAM!.

2007–08 

In 2007–08, seventeen teams competed in two conferences, the Western Conference which included seven teams and the Eastern Conference which included ten teams. The Cambridge Turbos won the NRL Championship by beating the Montreal Mission 2–1 in overtime.

The 2007–08 NRL Championship finals were played at the 2008 Canadian Ringette Championships in St. Albert, Alberta.

2008–09 

In 2008–09, the NRL consisted of eighteen teams grouped in a Western Conference with six teams and an Eastern Conference with twelve teams. The 2008–09 NRL season final took place at the 2009 Canadian Ringette Championships in Charlottetown, PEI, with the Cambridge Turbos finishing in first place.

Also in 2008, the first Ringette World Club Championship was held in Sault Ste. Marie, Ontario. Four NRL teams faced two teams from the Finland's elite ringette league, now known as "SM–Ringette". The Cambridge Turbos won the world title having overcome in the Finnish champion team, in the final.

2009–10 

In the 2009–10 season, the National Ringette League for its sixth season with eighteen teams competing. The league consisted of eight teams grouped together in a Western Conference with six teams, and an Eastern Conference with twelve teams. The competition remained very intense and marked the return of the ascendancy of different western Canadian teams.

The NRL playoffs took place in Saskatoon, Saskatchewan, during the Canadian Ringette Championships. The Edmonton WAM! became the NRL champions again after being eclipsed for two years by the Cambridge Turbos. Edmonton beat Cambridge 2–0 in the NRL league division final.

2010–11 

The 2010–11 NRL Championship finals were played at the 2011 Canadian Ringette Championships in Cambridge, Ontario between March 27, 2011, and April 2, 2011. In the final game of the NRL's league division, the Edmonton WAM! triumphed over the Cambridge Turbos.

2011–12 

In the 2011–12 season, the NRL entered its eighth season with nineteen teams playing in two conferences. The 2011–12 NRL Championship finals were played at the 2012 Canadian Ringette Championships in Burnaby, British Columbia.

The NRL experienced a new expansion during the 2011–12 season, with the creation of two new teams, the Atlantic Attack (of Moncton in New Brunswick) and Lower Mainland Ringette League (LMRL Thunder of British Columbia).

The 2011–12 regular season began on October 15, 2011, and concluded on March 18, 2012. All in all, thirty matches were contested by each of the teams during the regular season. Each of the teams only faced teams within their own conference. This structure allowed teams to reduce the costs of transport given the size of the Canadian territory covered by the league. At the end of the regular season, there is a break of a week when the various individual distinctions are awarded, then a National Ringette League Championship Tournament. This is the year the Elite Eight began.

2012–13 

The 2012–13 NRL Championship finals were played at the 2013 Canadian Ringette Championships in Fredericton, New Brunswick.

2013–14 

The 2013–14 NRL Championship finals were played at the 2014 Canadian Ringette Championships in Regina, Saskatchewan.

2014–15 

The 2014–15 NRL Championship finals were played at the 2015 Canadian Ringette Championships in Wood Buffalo, Alberta. The season's winners were the Cambridge Turbos, runners-up were the Richmond Hill Lightning, and the Edmonton WAM! finished in third.

2015–16 

The 2015–16 NRL Championship finals were played at the 2016 Canadian Ringette Championships in London, Ontario. The 2015–16 season's winners were the Cambridge Turbos, runners-up were the Gloucester Devils, and the Ottawa Ice finished in third.

2016–17 

The 2016–17 NRL Championship finals were played at the 2017 Canadian Ringette Championships in Leduc, Alberta.

2017–18 

The 2017–18 NRL season began on September 30, 2017, and ended on April 14, 2018. The 2018 Canadian Ringette Championships took place in Winnipeg, Manitoba, from April 9 to April 14, 2018.

2018–19 

The 2018–19 season's winners were the Calgary RATH, runners-up were the Atlantic Attack, and the Cambridge Turbos finished in third.

2019–20 
The 2019–20 National Ringette League season was cancelled due to the COVID-19 pandemic.

2020–21 
The 2020–21 National Ringette League season was cancelled due to the COVID-19 pandemic.

2021–22 

The 2021–22 season saw the league begin playing in a hub-format due to the COVID-19 pandemic. While the league previously played 15 teams, it was reduced to 12 for the season. 5 teams had withdrawn, including: BC Thunder, Bourassa Royal, Richmond Hill Lightning, Lac-Saint-Louis Adrenaline, and the Ottawa Ice. However, two new teams joined: the Nepean Ravens and the Saskatchewan Heat. The Manitoba Intact were renamed the Manitoba Herd.

The season's winners were the Calgary RATH, runners-up were the Edmonton WAM!, and the Cambridge Turbos finished in third.

2022–23 

The 2023 Canadian Ringette Championships will be hosted in Regina, Saskatchewan from April 9-15th, 2023.

National Ringette League playoffs
The National Ringette League playoffs are the knockout match, round robin, and tournament for determining the champion for National Ringette League (NRL).

 2014 National Ringette League playoffs
 2015 National Ringette League playoffs
 2016 National Ringette League playoffs
 2017 National Ringette League playoffs
 2018 National Ringette League playoffs

Broadcasting 
The National Ringette League championship final has usually been broadcast on Rogers TV.

Income and payment 

In 2008, the budget of each NRL team varied between $15,000 and $20000. The teams and the league contribute to cover all the transport spending, accommodation and rent of arenas. The players must find their own financiers to pay for their equipment and personal spending and the players are not paid for play. The audience in the matches for several NRL teams is limited to hundreds of supporters.

Player development 
The NRL maintains a collaboration with the lower Ringette leagues in regards to the development of the young female players, therefore several teams of the NRL have affiliated development teams for Under 19 years old and Under 16 years old. The Canadian Ringette Championships for U16 and U19 (usually taking place in April every year) takes place in the same place as the NRL playoff tournament elimination. It is this tournament which allows the tracers and talent scouts for the NRL teams to identify emerging young athletes as potential future NRL players.

Team history 

Over thirty teams have competed in the NRL during different periods of the league's existence. The first NRL season began in November 2004 with 17 teams. During the second NRL season in 2005–06, two new teams joined the league bringing the league total to nineteen. The teams were then divided into four conferences. However, during the off season, three teams folded, citing low attendance revenue. While the Manitoba Jets and Manitoba Prairie Fire teams folded, a new team was later created in the province in their stead, the Manitoba Intact, which competed in the NRL Western Conference. For the 2021–22, the Intact were renamed the "Manitoba Herd".

For the 2021–22 season, the National Ringette League had a number of teams withdraw from the league for various reasons, primarily due to Covid-19. For the prior 2020-21 season, the NRL had fifteen teams competing, with the BC Thunder failing to put forward a team and withdrawing. In 2021–2022 a new team was formed in Ontario, the Nepean Ravens, and the NRL returned to Saskatchewan with a new team, the Saskatchewan Heat. For the 2022-23 season, the BC Thunder rejoined the league.

(* = returned to league)

Regular season team records 

Initial record was from 2007–08 season.
Stats updated as of end of 2017–18 season. Teams in italics no longer compete in the National Ringette League as of the 2021-22 season.

Pandemic
Due to the COVID-19 pandemic, the NRL trophy was not awarded during the 2019–20 season nor the 2020–21 season. The 2019–20 and 2020–21 seasons were cancelled due to the COVID-19 pandemic. The 2021–22 season saw the league change its competitive structure due to COVID-19 by adopting a new "hub format" and the usual 15 team league became a league of 12 teams. The same season saw the BC Thunder discontinue its participation in the NRL, with Bourassa Royal, Lac-Saint-Louis Adrenaline, the Richmond Hill Lightning and the Ottawa Ice also withdrawing, but saw two new teams join: the Nepean Ravens and the Saskatchewan Heat. Meanwhile, the Manitoba Intact were renamed the "Manitoba Herd". For the 2022–23 season, the BC Thunder returned to the league.

The 2019–20 and 2020–21 seasons were cancelled due to the COVID-19 pandemic. The 2021–22 season saw the league begin playing in a hub-format instead. While the league previously played 15 teams, it was reduced to 12 for the 2021–22 season. Prior to the COVID-19 pandemic, the 2018–19 season included fifteen National Ringette League teams in Canada.

In October 2021, despite having announced team tryouts for September 2021, the BC Thunder, an NRL Western Conference team, announced on social media that they would not be putting a team forward in the NRL for the 2021–22 season. In total five teams withdrew for the 2021–22 season while two new teams were created. The five teams which withdrew included the BC Thunder, Bourassa Royal, Richmond Hill Lightning, Lac-Saint-Louis Adrenaline, and the Ottawa Ice. The two new teams formed in 2021–22 included the Nepean Ravens in Ontario and the Saskatchewan Heat in Saskatchewan.

Notable people

Keely Brown

Keely Brown played for the Edmonton WAM! for 10 years as its goaltender and helped form the league in 2002 and 2003.

Terry McAdam
Terry McAdam from Saskatchewan was inducted into the Ringette Canada Hall of Fame in 2021. McAdam was instrumental in helping begin the development of the National Ringette League as well as one of its first teams, the Saskatoon Wild. During its time in the NRL, the Wild had also acquired Erin Cumpstone.

Erin Cumpston
Erin Cumpstone was a player for the NRL's Saskatoon Wild and was also a member of Canada's 2010 National Ringette Team during the 2010 World Ringette Championships. Cumpstone also played ringette at the 1999 Canada Winter Games. She was also a highly accomplished softball player and played for Canada's women's national softball team which finished in 5th place at the 2004 Summer Olympics. Cumpston later became a coach for the National Ringette League's, Saskatchewan Heat.

Keely Brown
Former Team Canada goaltender, Keely Brown, helped form the NRL in 2002 and 2003.

Salla Naakka (Kyhälä)
 (née Kyhälä) is one of a number of ringette players from Finland who competed in the NRL. Kyhälä played for the now defunct NRL team, the Saskatoon Wild, and also played for the Finland national ringette team.

Anna Vanhatalo
Anna Vanhatalo was a goaltender for the Montreal Mission. Originally from Finland, Vanhatalo also played for Finland's national ringette team in 2004 and 2007.

Gallery

See also
 Ringette
  Canadian Ringette Championships
  SM-Ringette - semipro ringette league in Finland, formerly known as 
  Ringette Dam-SM - semipro ringette league in Sweden
 International Competitions

Notes and references

External links
   National Ringette League Website
 Ringette Canada
 NRL team logos from 2009

NRL
Ringette
 
Ringette competitions
!
 Women
Canada
Canada
Semi-professional sports leagues
History of women's sports
Women's sports governing bodies in Canada